MO5 may refer to:
Memories Off 5 The Unfinished Film, a Japanese visual novel
Thomson MO5, a home computer
Former name used by MI5